Events in the year 2019 in Bulgaria.

Incumbents
 President: Rumen Radev
 Prime Minister: Boyko Borisov

Events

6 January – Thousands of Orthodox Christians dived into icy rivers and lakes throughout the country to retrieve crucifixes placed by priests in the water to celebrate Epiphany.
16 February – More than 2,000 far-right activists from several European countries staged a torchlit procession through Sofia honoring Nazist general and politician Hristo Lukov.
5 – 11 February – The 2019 Sofia Open tennis tournament took place at the Arena Armeec in Sofia.
8 – 10 March – The 2019 World Short Track Speed Skating Championships were held in Sofia.

Deaths

1 January – Ivan Dimitrov, footballer (b. 1935).
18 January – Ivan Vutsov, footballer (b. 1939).
22 January – Kiril Petkov,  Olympic wrestler (b. 1933).
22 April – Krasimir Bezinski, footballer (b. 1961).

References

 
2010s in Bulgaria
Years of the 21st century in Bulgaria
Bulgaria
Bulgaria